The Cornish pilot gig is a six-oared rowing boat, clinker-built of Cornish narrow-leaf elm,  long with a beam of . It is recognised as one of the first shore-based lifeboats that went to vessels in distress, with recorded rescues going back as far as the late 17th century.  The original purpose of the Cornish pilot gig was as a general work boat, and the craft is used as a  pilot boat, taking pilots out to incoming vessels off the Atlantic Coast. At the time pilots would compete between each other for work; the fastest gig crew who got their pilot on board a vessel first would get the job, and hence the payment.

Pilot gigs today

Today, pilot gigs are used primarily for sport, with around 100 clubs across the globe.  The main concentration is within Cornwall and the Isles of Scilly, however clubs exist in Suffolk, Sussex, Somerset, Hampshire, Devon, Dorset, Wales and London. Internationally, there are pilot gig clubs in France, the Netherlands, the Faroe Islands, Australia, Bermuda, and the United States.

All modern racing gigs are based on the Treffry, built in 1838 by William Peters of St Mawes, and still owned and raced by the Newquay Rowing Club. She was built for the Treffry Company, new owners of Newquay Harbour. However non-racing gigs have been built which do not conform to the exact specification of the Treffry and are disallowed from racing in competitive races.

The sport is governed by the Cornish Pilot Gig Association, which monitors all racing gigs during the construction phase.  The Association's Standards Officer is responsible for measuring every gig at least three times during construction, to ensure that it conforms to the Standard set by the Association. Gigs are crewed by six rowers, and helmed by a coxswain. Modern gig racing dates from 1986, the founding of the CPGA, and the codification of class rules for the construction of new gigs.

In 2018 the 200th gig was registered on the CPGA register, built by W.C. Hunkin and Sons of Fowey. A new gig, complete with trailer and all equipment, costs over £32,000. From 2017, the CPGA has encouraged a 'Club In A Box' scheme. This includes a fibreglass gig, which is much cheaper than a traditionally-built wooden gig and allows a club to form and begin training and fundraising for a competitive boat.

In the United States, pilot gig racing is becoming increasingly more popular, especially on the New England coastline where whaling was a major industry. These boats, however, are less regulated than their British counterparts. While modern rowing technology is considered inappropriate, there are no strict rules as to what can and cannot be raced. Boats are classed by number of rowers and their approximate age. The rules are also different during the race; generally "fisherman's rules" apply—meaning that there are no rules.

World championships

Since 1990, the World Pilot Gig Championships have been held annually on the Isles of Scilly.  Held over the first May bank holiday weekend, they are attended by over 2000 rowers and spectators, and is widely believed to be the busiest weekend on the islands, with an approximate doubling of population.

Pilot gig clubs
Pilot gig clubs are mostly located by the sea although there some that have been established at riverside locations. Pilot gig clubs might also have other types of rowing and sailing vessels.  The majority of clubs are in the Westcountry, however clubs exist in Suffolk, Sussex, Somerset, Devon, Dorset, Wales and London.  Internationally, there are pilot gig clubs in France, the Netherlands, the Faroe Islands, Australia, Bermuda, and the United States.

Many pilot gig clubs compete with each other through a series of events through the summer in the Westcountry, most notably at World Pilot Gig Championships.

78 pilot gig clubs are members of the Cornish Pilot Gig Association.

See also

References

External links

 
 
Muhabbet
A model of a Cornish Pilot Gig

Rowing racing boats
Pilot gig
Isles of Scilly

ru:Гичка